Gunfighters of Casa Grande is a 1964 Eurowestern film, co-produced by American and Spanish producers. Based on a story by Borden and Patricia Chase, it was later developed into a screenplay with the assistance of screenwriter Clark Reynolds and directed by Roy Rowland, the last film he made for Metro-Goldwyn-Mayer.

The film starred Alex Nicol, Jorge Mistral, Dick Bentley, Steve Rowland (son of the director), Phil Posner, Mercedes Alonso, Diana Lorys, Maria Granada, Roberto Rey and Aldo Sambrell. Antonio Mayans and José Manuel Martín both had minor appearances in the film, Martin having an uncredited role.

The film's trailer was originally narrated by voice actor Don LaFontaine in his first credited role. He had been working as recording engineer and copy writer when, after the original announcer failed to appear for the scheduled recording, LaFontaine agreed to record the trailer.

Plot
Joe Daylight is on the run along with members of his outlaw gang, The Kid, Doc and Henri. After fleeing from a bank robbery, they manage to elude the posse chasing them after crossing into Mexico. The gang had agreed to meet up later to divide up the money, however Daylight instead tells them that he has used the money to buy a hacienda, the Casa Grande. Although several of them protest, the gang agrees to follow Daylight to the ranch. He also enlists a mystical Mexican gunfighter called ”Viajero” (Traveller) – who knows the neighbourhood and comes from a haciendero family (though few know this) – to help him fit into the role of a Mexican hacienda owner, a hidalgo.

In effect, Daylight has won the hacienda in a poker game and his plan is to keep the gang together and use the ranch as a cover to rustle cattle from his neighbors and sell them at inflated prices across the border. However, his comrades soon adapt to life on the ranch. The Traveller and The Kid meet two women named Dona Maria de Castellar and Pacesita, with whom they eventually fall in love.

Daylight's plans are temporarily threatened by another bandit gang led by Rojo, who begins stealing cattle from numerous ranches in the area including his own. Organizing the local ranchers against the bandits, they succeed in destroying Rojo and his men. This has an unintended consequence however as Daylight's men have decided to remain at Casa Grande. He and his men begin to argue and, during the course of events, shoots and kills Doc causing The Traveller to kill Daylight in turn. With their former leader dead, the men stay on the ranch and The Traveller and Maria begin a new life on the Casa Grande.

Cast
 Alex Nicol as Joe Daylight — an outlaw and professional gambler, he is the leader of a group of bandits rustling cattle across the US-Mexican border.
 Jorge Mistral as The Traveller — a recent member of the gang, he is the most outspoken of the group questioning Daylight's leadership.
 Steve Rowland as The Kid — the youngest member of the gang, he and The Traveller become friends. Although reluctantly supporting Daylight, he and The Traveller eventually side against him.
 Dick Bentley as Doc — one Daylight's three partners, he is an elderly outlaw. Although less vocal, he wishes to retire in Mexico with the others.
 Phil Posner as Henri — another of Daylight's partners.
 Mercedes Alonso as Dona Maria de Castellar — the daughter of a neighboring rancher, she falls in love with The Traveller.
 Diana Lorys as Gitana — the girlfriend of Joe Daylight.
 Maria Granada as Pacesita — the personal maid and confidant of Maria, she and The Kid also become involved romantically.
 Roberto Rey as Don Castellar de Verdugo — a neighboring rancher and landowner. He is the father of Maria de Castellar.
 Aldo Sambrell as Rojo — a rival bandit leader whose gang is threatening the ranchers in the area, including Joe Daylight's outfit.
Toni Fuentes - Carlos
Angel Solano - Don Ariola
Jim Gillen - sheriff
Mike Ekiss - deputy
Fernando Villena - Mario
 Emilio Rodriguez - Francisco
Ana Maria Custodio - Senora Durano
Mario Barros - Rio
Ivan Tubau - Pecos
Jose Mayens - Manuel
Miguel Brendel as Mike Brendel - bartender
Simon Arriaga - Carvajal
Jose Martin - Don Luis Ariola

Reception
Gunfight at Casa Grande was released in Spain during early 1964 and premiered in the United States on April 1, 1964; it was later released in Europe between May 1964 and September 1965. Moderately successful, the film earned 19,939,562 ₧ (US: $189,608) during its initial run in Spain. As of September 1, 1965, the film was still running in American theaters and appeared in the New York-area as a double feature along with She.

The film was aired on television in the United States during the late 1960s until the mid-1970s and again during the early-to-mid-1990s. The film was released on DVD during the early 2000s, although this was on a limited scale and consequently remains one of the more obscure and hard-to-find westerns.

In his investigation of narrative structures in Spaghetti Western films, Fridlund writes that Gunfighters of Casa Grande basically conforms to the "Classical Plot" in Will Wright's analysis of US Westerns, and Traveller is a "Classical" hero who comes from the outside, saves society (first from Rojo and then from Daylight) and then stays inside. However, the cunning manipulator and unpredictable psychopath Daylight shows a close affinity to many main characters in the wave of Spaghetti Western films about to emerge on the screens.

References

External links
 
 
 
Gunfighters of Casa Grande at the British Film Institute
Gunfighters of Casa Grande at the Spaghetti Western Database

1964 films
1964 Western (genre) films
Spanish Western (genre) films
American Western (genre) films
1960s English-language films
Films directed by Roy Rowland
CinemaScope films
Films set in Mexico
Metro-Goldwyn-Mayer films
Films scored by Johnny Douglas
1960s American films